All-Star Sunday Afternoon Party (ASAP), currently branded as ASAP Natin 'To, is a Philippine television variety show produced by ABS-CBN Entertainment.

Originally hosted by Martin Nievera, Pops Fernandez, Ariel Rivera and Dayanara Torres, it is currently hosted by Nievera along with Zsa Zsa Padilla, Gary Valenciano, Erik Santos, Luis Manzano, Kim Chiu, Enchong Dee, Ogie Alcasid, Regine Velasquez-Alcasid and Janine Gutierrez.  The show premiered on February 5, 1995, replacing its predecessor Sa Linggo nAPO Sila and marks as the longest running Sunday noontime variety show, after surpassing rival network GMA's GMA Supershow’s record of nearly two decades. In October 2015, ASAP became the first live entertainment program in the Philippines to be broadcast in true high-definition picture, the other being a sports program and It's Showtime.

ASAP premiered on ABS-CBN, where it aired until May 2020, when the broadcast of the network was halted due to its non-renewal of its franchise. New live episodes have since aired in the Kapamilya Channel, a pay network set up by ABS-CBN Corporation with simulcast on the broadcaster's other cable channel which is Jeepney TV. A2Z and TV5 have also received rights to broadcast ASAP through the partnership of the networks' firms with ABS-CBN Corporation. The program is also streamed online via iWantTFC, TFC IPTV and Kapamilya Online Live. It is also aired internationally through The Filipino Channel on cable and satellite.

History

ASAP first decade (1995–2003)

When Sa Linggo nAPO Sila became 'Sang Linggo nAPO Sila to replace Eat Bulaga! (which left ABS-CBN to transfer to GMA Network after TAPE Inc. denied ABS-CBN's offer to buy the airing rights of the show), a TV show was conceptualized by a group of production people from the displaced APO show in January 1995 as a "concert party" on Sundays. Martin Nievera accidentally joined the group while on break from taping his eponymous talk show. He gave the show the title acronym ASAP which stood for All-Star Sunday Afternoon Party. The production group decided to bring him and Pops Fernandez, along with Ariel Rivera and Dayanara Torres as main hosts for the show. The cast of Pare Ko (Claudine Barretto, Victor Neri, Roselle Nava, Gio Alvarez, Jao Mapa, Mark Anthony Fernandez, Nikka Valencia) became co-hosts for the show to attract the younger viewers. In 1996, the show's line-up of co-hosts and performers evolved as it included different young stars from ABS-CBN's Talent Center (Ang TV, Gimik and Star Circle). The show also celebrated its first anniversary as it finally wrested the top spot away from its closest rival GMA Supershow. The show became victorious in 1997 as they celebrated their 2nd anniversary from the Araneta Coliseum, as their erstwhile institutional rival show GMA Supershow folded up, replaced by SOP.

The show originally had its own theme song, Hot na Hot sa ASAP in 1995. During the show's second anniversary, another theme song was released entitled Better Than Ever. Initial broadcast commenced on February 5, 1995, at the Delta Theatre in Quezon Avenue. In 1997, they transferred to Studio 3 of the ABS-CBN Broadcasting Center in Quezon City, sharing space with 'Sang Linggo nAPO Sila. However, the show hit a snag on May 10, 1998, when one of the main hosts, Martin Nievera resigned from the show because of marital issues with co-host (and now ex-wife) Pops Fernandez. Dayanara Torres later on left the show to pursue a career in Hollywood. Richard Gomez Zsa Zsa Padilla and Gary Valenciano became regular hosts from that time on as replacements to Nievera and Torres.

On February 7, 1999, the show was broadcast simultaneously from the Cuneta Astrodome in Pasay and the University of St. La Salle Coliseum in Bacolod City to usher the second season of the MBA. Magandang Tanghali Bayan main hosts Randy Santiago, John Estrada and Willie Revillame helped out in hosting ASAP from Bacolod while the main hosts were in Cuneta Astrodome. In the same year, the show celebrated the finales of its top-rating soaps Mula sa Puso and Esperanza through a grand production number.

In 2001, the producers added the tagline "The Only One" to the show's title to emphasize itself as unique amidst the rise of shows duplicating its concept. On March 11 of the same year, the show created new sensations out of "The Hunks", a new group composed of long-time Kapamilya heartthrobs Piolo Pascual, Diether Ocampo, Jericho Rosales, Carlos Agassi and Bernard Palanca. Their phenomenal success as a group made noise around Philippine entertainment circles as they stormed their way through various appearances within ABS-CBN shows and concerts abroad. ASAP rival show SOP even got wind of the group's popularity by creating a spoof group, "Da HungHunks".

In 2002, the show lost former co-host and occasional guest Rico Yan to pancreatitis, while Jolina Magdangal left ASAP and transferred to GMA Network to join SOP, along with Marvin Agustin who would later be at the network in 2006. Richard Gomez also left the show in that same year after signing an exclusive contract with GMA Network. The show was also known for being the go-to show for the premiere of ABS-CBN summer station IDs by that period until 2015, when TV Patrol and It's Showtime changed venue. The show also introduced daring segments such as Rated R (headed by Rica Peralejo) and Clash Dance (Regine Tolentino and Angela Velez).

In May 2002, Martin Nievera officially returned to ASAP after four years of hiatus a main host due to his marital issues with Fernandez and Valenciao, and he served as a permanent replacement to Richard Gomez when the latter formally ended his contract with ABS-CBN and moved to rival network GMA 7.

In February 2003, ASAP celebrated its 8th anniversary with another special show at the Araneta Coliseum. The anniversary show was remembered for the launch of the year-long celebration of ABS-CBN's 50th year of Philippine television. It was also by that time when a major controversy happened when Angela Velez suddenly had a wardrobe malfunction while dancing on stage.

On that same period until August 2003, the show simulcasted on ABS-CBN's sister station Studio 23 (now known as S+A).

ASAP Mania (2003–2005)
In May 2003, the show was reformatted as ASAP Mania, after it lost its top-rating status to SOP Rules. Some original main hosts like Ariel Rivera and Pops Fernandez later on left the show while Martin Nievera and Zsa Zsa Padilla started hosting the show on a semi-regular basis. The biggest talent acquisitions of the show, however, were Gary Valenciano and Kuh Ledesma who joined in to replaced Rivera and Fernandez. Valenciano and Ledesma signed exclusive contracts with ABS-CBN and also shared the former's creative inputs to make the show more interesting. In addition, Valenciano also celebrated his 20th showbiz anniversary on that show earlier that year.

Some ASAP segments like Star in a Million and Victim became a hit with the viewers that the ABS-CBN management decided to turn both segments into full-length shows on weekend primetime in November of that year. The move resulted in the network regaining lost audience share on weekends as both shows rated high against their rival counterparts.

In 2004, ASAP gradually regained leadership with the addition of singing champions from Viva-produced singing contests Star for a Night and Search for a Star (Sarah Geronimo, Mark Bautista and Rachelle Ann Go) and ABS-CBN's very own Star in a Million (Sheryn Regis, Christian Bautista and Erik Santos) along with their runners-up. In May of the same year, it also introduced a spin-off show ASAP Fanatic to serve as a venue for its new young stars (some of which came from Star Circle Quest) to perform and interact with fans. The show held a special advanced anniversary episode on October 10 of the same year at the Folk Arts Theater and the PhilSports Arena.

2005–2009
In 2005, the format changed to ASAP '05 and added rising TV host Toni Gonzaga and commercial model-turned singer Nikki Gil.

In 2006, the show absorbed talents from the displaced spin-off show ASAP Fanatic and became a three-hour show. It also launched a somewhat complicated logo resembling LED lights where the words ASAP were made out of dots connected which had been in use until 2014. Also in January of that same year, boxing legend Manny Pacquiao guested on the show.

On June 18, 2006, Kim Chiu and Gerald Anderson performed for the first time on the ASAP stage following their stint on Pinoy Big Brother: Teen Edition 1. A few months later, the ASAP Pop Viewers' Choice Awards was launched where they honor the best in domestic pop culture.

In February 2007, Asia's Nightingale Lani Misalucha joined the show on a temporary basis while ex-SOP performers Karylle (daughter of Zsa Zsa Padilla) and Billy Crawford followed suit in 2008. The show also rolled out a grand welcome fit for royalty when it introduced then-Kapuso Primetime actress Angel Locsin as the newest Kapamilya actress in August and the following month, KC Concepcion after a long stay in Paris.

On January 27, 2008, the show was aired through different locations as the show also officially started the 55th anniversary celebrations of ABS-CBN.

The year 2009 saw milestones for the show as it launched new groups including the Kanto Boys and Sessionistas. Midway through that year, the ratings of its rival show SOP declined due to ASAP again completely regaining the credibility, prestige, and acclaim it once lost to the former. As a result, its rival show reformatted before that same year ended but the move no longer worked with the viewers. It also paid tribute to Efren Peñaflorida who was hailed as CNN Hero as well as former President Corazon Aquino in August (who happens to be the mother of recurring guest star Kris Aquino).

2010–2015
On January 3, 2010, the show was relaunched as ASAP XV to mark its fifteenth anniversary. Year numbers in the show title weren't adapted but instead anniversary marks was used. America's Best Dance Crew champion Jabbawockeez also became guest performers since then. During the show's special anniversary episode on February 7, 2010, a new set was introduced and an opening break bumper (OBB) was instituted for the first time. Competition became a three-way battle when GMA Network (Party Pilipinas) and TV5 (P.O.5) produced their own "concert party" shows, where some of their talents and staff were ASAP alumni. In October of that same year, the show celebrated the diamond anniversary of another valued advertiser of ABS-CBN which is P&G Philippines and Carol Banawa guested once again to promote her new album.

On January 2, 2011, the show was launched as ASAP Rocks as a way of asserting its over-the-top but tastefully conceptualized production numbers, and the first episode for 2011 began with a short AVP emphasizing the Concert Experience format. On April 3, 2011, a new set was introduced, and for the first time in show's history, the show welcomed Eat Bulaga main host Vic Sotto as a special guest, performing in the show twice (April and December 2011) to promote separately the two movies that he did for ABS-CBN's film arm Star Cinema. In his December 2011 guesting, Vic was joined by some of his Eat Bulaga! co-hosts on stage to promote the MMFF entry Enteng ng Ina Mo. The show also lost its two former co-hosts and performers AJ Perez and RJ Rosales that same year due to their respective deaths.

On January 1, 2012, the show again used year numbers after it was last used in 2009 with ASAP 2012. On January 22 of that same year, the show celebrated the Chinese New Year through a special episode taped at the Quirino Grandstand. The following month, Sarah Geronimo temporarily left the show as she was given her own primetime show, Sarah G. Live. July of that year saw the show making milestone episodes which include the 20th anniversary of Star Magic, a tribute to Comedy King Dolphy, and the 50th and 30th showbiz anniversaries of Vilma Santos and Martin Nievera respectively. In August of that year, the show gave support to its main host Zsa Zsa Padilla as she battled a kidney disease before returning in September. On December 16 of that year, Venezuelan heartthrob actor Fernando Carrillo guested on the show during his visit to the Philippines.

On January 6, 2013, the show again used anniversary marks to indicate the years they air on TV after it was last used in 2010 with ASAP 18 to commemorate the show's 18th anniversary. On October 6 of the same year, the show celebrated the 60th anniversary of ABS-CBN and Philippine television through a special episode held at the Marikina Sports Complex.

On January 5, 2014, the show was relaunched as ASAP 19 to commemorate the show's 19th anniversary along with a special segment paying tribute to Lea Salonga for her 35th showbiz anniversary. The show also reached its 1,000th episode in April 2014.

On January 4, 2015, the show was relaunched as ASAP 20 to commemorate the show's 20th anniversary. It launched a new, simple logo that replaced the one being used from 2006, and from that point, Sarah Geronimo, Toni Gonzaga, Piolo Pascual, & Bamboo became main hosts of the show as seen in their entire logo animation (this was usually used before commercial breaks).

Also during that time, the tide tilted in favor of ASAP once again when some mainstays from their rival shows transferred networks and started appearing in the show. Among the notable transfers were actress Iza Calzado, R&B royalties Jay-R and Kyla, and StarStruck V Ultimate Female Survivor Sarah Lahbati, who also performed regularly while showing her remarkable fierce and sizzling sexy dance moves after a bitter falling out with her former network.

In August 2015, the show faced another challenge when they got into a tough ratings battle with GMA's new Sunday variety show Sunday PinaSaya that showcased more comedy skits than musical numbers. The show had to make adjustments by reducing the musical production numbers and incorporated a more variety format of games and skits. ASAP original host Martin Nievera courted controversy when he vented his ire on the show's changes via Twitter, but later clarified his reaction saying he believes these changes in the format of the show are a way to “satisfy many markets with dignity and class". As a response to "Sunday Pinasaya"'s rising popularity, the ABS-CBN management decided to revert ASAP to its original concert party format and cut the show's running time to 2 hours, and accommodate the late-night comedy gag show Banana Split Extra Scoop which was renamed to Banana Sundae in mid-November 2015. A few weeks later, Elmo Magalona, son of Philippine King of Rap Francis Magalona, switched networks and became part of the show.

2016–2018

On January 3, 2016, for the first time in 13 years, the show retained the title ASAP alone. Thereafter, Jolina Magdangal and Luis Manzano became main hosts of the show along with Toni Gonzaga, Piolo Pascual and Sarah Geronimo.

In February 2016, another singing contest grand winner from GMA Network, Jonalyn Viray transferred to ABS-CBN under the screen name Jona and officially joined the show. A few weeks later, ASAP moved to an earlier timeslot at 11:45 am, and extended its runtime to 2 hours and 45 minutes. Meanwhile, the  comedy gag show Banana Sundae was transferred to a later timeslot at 2:30 pm.

On May 15, 2016, ASAP launched two singing groups, the ASAP Birit Queens, composed of Jona Viray, Morissette, Klarisse de Guzman and Angeline Quinto and the ASAP Soul Sessions, composed of Jason Dy, Daryl Ong, Jay R, KZ Tandingan and Kyla. However, both groups disbanded in late 2017 as part of the show's introduction of new segments that were more youthful. Two weeks later, the show celebrated the 25th anniversary of MMK with Charo Santos-Concio as a guest who paid tribute to its impact on Philippine television.

Later, on July 3 of that year, the show instituted a new segment ASAPinoy, paying tribute to Filipino composers and singers which contributed to the success of Original Pilipino Music (OPM), with a special episode held at the Newport Performing Arts Theater. The show later welcomed Ogie Alcasid as a regular performer by October of the same year, after a few years of guest appearances. However, this segment ended in October 2018 with Ariel Rivera as the last artist to pay tribute to, followed by Rico J. Puno during the Himig Handog 2018 Finals after his death.

On May 21, 2017, ASAP staged a special episode at the Smart Araneta Coliseum in celebration of Star Magic's 25th anniversary and was soon divided into two parts. The first part was staged live, while the second part (aired the following week) was pre-taped.

In January 2018, ASAP replaced their existing segments with new segments including ASAP TLC: The Love Connection replacing ASAP LSS: Love Songs and Stories and adding ASAP RePlay Retro Playlist, honoring legendary international acts. On April 15 of that year, ASAP launched a dance segment titled ASAP MYX: The Maja-Yassi Xperience and a teen singing group called ASAP G! in June.

ASAP Natin 'To (since 2018)
After ASAP Live in Sydney and the Himig Handog 2018 Grand Finals, it was confirmed through different showbiz websites that the show will undergo a reformat as ASAP Natin 'To which also coincides with the entry of Regine Velasquez as one of the show's main hosts. Jasmin Pallera was named as the new supervising producer/business unit head of the show, replacing long-time business unit head Joyce Liquicia. Some of the show's cast were retained contrary to reports that some of them won't be seen on the show. On November 15, 2018, all social media accounts of ASAP unveiled the teaser and the new logo of the now revitalized show to be renamed ASAP Natin 'To. Only the typeface since 2015 continues to be used, and no segments from the previous era were carried over.

The reformatted show premiered on November 18, 2018, a week after the Himig Handog 2018 Grand Finals. On December 2, 2018, a new online show "I Want ASAP" was launched hosted by Robi Domingo, Donny Pangilinan, Maymay Entrata and Edward Barber. The online show airs at 11:30 am PHT, 15 minutes before the airing of ASAP Natin 'To, replacing ASAP Chillout.

On December 2, 2018, the show launched their first segment under the new format entitled The Greatest Showdown, featuring various singers. As of now, Martin Nievera and Jolina Magdangal are the only original remaining artists since the show's airing in 1995.

2020-present: 25th anniversary, COVID-19 lockdowns and ABS-CBN 2's indefinite shutdown
On January 5, 2020, ASAP Natin' To celebrated its 25th anniversary in advance, and also partly reverted to its original format.

On February 9, 2020, ASAP Natin' To launched a new segment titled ASAP Concert Presents, with the Pair of Aces (Jona and Darren Espanto) performing on the first prod of the segment.

On March 10, 2020, ASAP Natin 'To, along with other ABS-CBN shows temporarily stopped the admission of the live studio audience as part of the country's fight against the COVID-19 pandemic in the Philippines. On March 15, 2020, as Metro Manila entered a lockdown, the show stopped staging live episodes and aired replays for the first 2 weeks, despite having a scheduled live episode that was supposed to be staged on the said date, but was cancelled due to the lockdown. The show later taped new episodes via remote work arrangements via Zoom, for the following weeks from March 29, 2020, onwards. As of January 2023, ASAP has yet to admit a physical live audience, and still admits a virtual audience via Zoom.

In April 2020, ASAP Natin 'To's airtime was shortened to one hour and moved to Banana Sundae's timeslot of 2:30 pm until May 3, 2020, which was its last airing before the shutdown of ABS-CBN's free to air stations. The move was part of ABS-CBN's temporary programming schedule due to the Luzon Lockdown done to stop the COVID-19 pandemic in the Philippines, and in response to rival network GMA extending Kapuso Movie Festival to a two-movie block, which made the network extend the Sunday edition of Kapamilya Blockbusters Family Weekend to two movies.

On May 5, 2020, the National Telecommunications Commission issued a cease and desist order against ABS-CBN Corporation, forcing all of its free-to-air television and radio stations to temporarily suspend their operations due to the expiration of its legislative franchise, causing ASAP, as well as the rest of ABS-CBN shows to temporarily suspend their airings.

On June 14, 2020, the show resumed its in-studio taping/live staging (once a month) of new episodes for broadcast on cable-and-satellite channel Kapamilya Channel, with a virtual audience being admitted in place of an actual studio audience while using artificial crowd noise. Also on the same day, iWant ASAP resumed its telecast via a remote work arrangement through Zoom Video Communications. Owing to safety precautions against the COVID-19 pandemic in the Philippines, the show entails a 4-day lock-in taping set-up to produce 3 episodes per taping cycle, with only the episode done during the lock-in period being staged live from the studio itself.

In August 2020, ASAP was reduced to a 2-hour airtime again since 2015 after the franchise of ABS-CBN was denied by the Congress.

In September 2020, ASAP's main director Johnny Manahan and cast members Piolo Pascual, Billy Crawford, Maja Salvador, Catriona Gray, Maris Racal, Donny Pangilinan and Zephanie left the show. They were signed up by independent television producer Brightlight Productions for new shows that air on TV5 under a blocktime agreement between the network and the aforementioned. Manahan produced the daily noontime show Lunch Out Loud that is hosted by Crawford and also directed the now-defunct Sunday noontime show Sunday Noontime Live! headlined by Piolo Pascual, Catriona Gray, Maja Salvador, Donny Pangilinan and Jake Ejercito. Joane Laygo, who has been directing the show since the 2018 reformat, became the permanent main director of the said show.

On October 11, 2020, the show went back on free TV via the newly launched A2Z Channel 11 under a blocktime agreement between the network and religious broadcaster, ZOE Broadcasting Network. Also, on the same day, the show returned to the 12:00 PM timeslot.

On January 24, 2021, the show began airing its simulcast as a blocktimer on TV5 as part of a reported partnership between ABS-CBN and Cignal TV, which handles TV5's programming, replacing Sunday Noontime Live!. Despite this development, the show will continue to air on A2Z Channel 11, Kapamilya Channel, and Kapamilya Online Live.

In March 2021, certain performers who were part of Sunday Noontime Live!, such as Donny Pangilinan, Maris Racal and Zephanie returned to ASAP after their stint in the said show.

On April 4 and 11, 2021, ASAP Natin 'To temporarily aired replays of previous episodes as a result of suspending taping/live staging of new episodes after airing two pre-taped episodes due to the reimposed enhanced community quarantine caused by the surge of COVID-19 cases and deaths in the Greater Manila Area due to the 2020 holiday season, new variants of COVID-19, non-compliance to health and safety protocols, as well as a full bed capacity in different Hospitals. The show would resume airing live/fresh episodes on April 18, 2021.

Following the return to studio after the aforementioned COVID-19 surge, ASAP Natin 'To launched several new segments, such as ASAP PPOP (a segment for groups like BINI and BGYO), New Gen Divas (an all-female vocal group composed of Janine Berdin, Elha Nympha, Sheena Belarmino and Zephanie; later replaced by Fatima Lagueras aka Fana due to her transfer to GMA Network in 2022), ASAP Fresh, ASAP Exclusive, ASAP Discoveries and ASAP Transformation.

On July 11, 2021, ASAP held a special episode titled 'Kapamilya Forever Day' a year after ABS-CBN's franchise was denied by 70 congressmen.

On November 5, 2022, ASAP returned to the international scene after two years of hiatus due to the COVID-19 pandemic in the Philippines. Its first international show since the pandemic was held at the Orleans Arena in Las Vegas, Nevada.

On January 8, 2023, ASAP introduced its new studio set. It is the first major redesign since 2017. Despite the aforementioned change, the show still continues to tape episodes for the later weeks, and airing replay episodes for the final week of each month.

Cast

Main hosts
 Martin Nievera (1995–1998; since 2002)
 Zsa Zsa Padilla (since 1998)
 Luis Manzano (since 2003)
 Gary Valenciano (since 2003)
 Sarah Geronimo (since 2004)
 Erik Santos (since 2004)
 Kim Chiu (since 2006)
 Enchong Dee (since 2008)
 Ogie Alcasid (since 2017)
 Regine Velasquez-Alcasid (since 2018)
 Janine Gutierrez (since 2021)

iWant ASAP main hosts
 Robi Domingo (since 2008)
 Darren Espanto (since 2015)
 Maymay Entrata (since 2017)
 Edward Barber (since 2017)
 Andi Abaya (since 2021)
 Kobie Brown (since 2021)
 Shanaia Gomez (since 2022) 
 Misha de Leon (since 2022) 
 Jeremy Glinoga (since 2022)

Former main hosts / occasional performers
 Jolina Magdangal (1995–2002; since 2014)
 Vhong Navarro (since 1996)
 Lea Salonga (since 1997)
 Sharon Cuneta (since 2015)

Co-hosts, performers and occasional guests

 Roselle Nava (1995–2003; 2010; since 2015)
 Carlo Aquino (1995–2005; since 2012)
 Marvin Agustin (1995–2005; 2014–2017; since 2021)
 Angelica Panganiban (since 1995)
 Jamie Rivera (since 1995)
 Claudine Barretto (1995–2009; since 2015)
 Diether Ocampo (1995–2016; since 2018)
 Dimples Romana (1997–2003; since 2010)
 Nikki Valdez (since 1997)
 Jericho Rosales (since 1997)
 Piolo Pascual (1996–1998; 2000–2020; since 2021)
 Jodi Sta. Maria (since 1999)
 Vina Morales (since 2001)                                                                                                                                                        
 Pia Wurtzbach (2002–2006; since 2016)
 Nina (2003–2011; since 2015)
 Shaina Magdayao (2004–2019; since 2022)
 Anne Curtis (since 2004)
 Sheryn Regis (2004–2010; since 2014)
 Roxanne Guinoo (2004–2010; since 2015)
 Joross Gamboa (2004–2009; 2012–2015; since 2017)
 Erich Gonzales (since 2005)
 Jake Zyrus (since 2005)
 Jed Madela (since 2005)
 G-Force (since 2005)
 Sam Milby (since 2006)
 Davey Langit (2006–2008; since 2017)
 Yeng Constantino (since 2006)
 Gerald Anderson (since 2006)
 Sam Concepcion (since 2006)
 Zanjoe Marudo (since 2006)
 Empress Schuck  (2006–2014; since 2021)
 Bela Padilla (2007–2009; since 2015)
 KC Concepcion (2007–2016; since 2020)
 Angel Locsin (since 2007)
 Laarni Lozada (since 2008)
 Denise Laurel (since 2008)
 Arron Villaflor (since 2008)
 Ejay Falcon (since 2008)
 Jake Cuenca (since 2008)
 Cristine Reyes (since 2008)
 Arnel Pineda (since 2008)
 Vice Ganda (since 2008)
 Liezel Garcia (since 2008)
 Richard Poon (since 2008)
 Bugoy Drilon (since 2008)
 Ice Seguerra (since 2009) 
 Sitti (since 2009)
 Nyoy Volante (since 2009)
 Matteo Guidicelli (since 2009)
 Zaijian Jaranilla (since 2009)
 Coco Martin (since 2009)
 Julia Montes (since 2010)
 Melai Cantiveros (2010–2013; since 2015)
 Bianca Manalo (since 2010)
 James Reid (2010–2012; since 2014)
 Enrique Gil (since 2010)
 Kathryn Bernardo (since 2010)
 Mutya Orquia (since 2011)
 Xyriel Manabat  (since 2011)
 Angeline Quinto (since 2011)
 Zia Quizon (since 2011)
 Juris (since 2011)
 Tippy Dos Santos (since 2011)
 Alex Castro (since 2011)
 JM de Guzman (since 2011)
 Bryan Termulo (since 2011)
 Joseph Marco (since 2011)
 Marcelito Pomoy (since 2011)
 Bamboo (since 2011)  
 Paulo Avelino (since 2012)                                                                                                                                                        
 Young JV (since 2012)
 Iza Calzado (since 2012)
 Yves Flores (since 2012)
 Kiko Estrada (2012–2014; since 2019)
 Paolo Valenciano (since 2012)
 KZ Tandingan (since 2012)
 Daniel Padilla (since 2012)
 Dominic Roque (since 2012)
 Abra (since 2013)
 Yen Santos (since 2013)
 Arjo Atayde (since 2013)
 Yam Concepcion (since 2013)
 Klarisse de Guzman (since 2013)
 Liza Soberano (since 2013)
 Julia Barretto (since 2013)
 Morissette (since 2013)
 Kean Cipriano (since 2013)
 AJ Muhlach (since 2013)
 Grae Fernandez (since 2013)
 Sharlene San Pedro (since 2013)
 Mitoy Yonting (since 2013)
 Ella Cruz (since 2013)
 Thor (since 2013)
 Jane Oineza (since 2013)
 Kit Thompson (since 2013)
 Diego Loyzaga (since 2013)
 JC de Vera (since 2013)
 Marco Gumabao (since 2013)
 Andrea Brillantes (since 2013)
 Coleen Garcia (since 2013)
 Michelle Vito (since 2013)
 Sam Mangubat (2013–2020; since 2021)
 Janella Salvador (since 2013)
 Jerome Ponce (since 2013)
 Lyca Gairanod (since 2014)
 Sofia Andres (since 2014)
 Alexa Ilacad (since 2014)
 Nash Aguas (since 2014)
 Isabelle Daza (since 2014)
 Paolo Onesa (since 2014)
 Nadine Lustre (since 2014)
 Joj & Jai Agpangan (since 2014)
 Ebe Dancel (since 2014)
 Juan Karlos Labajo (since 2014)
 Ellen Adarna (since 2015)
 Victor Silayan (since 2015)
 Loisa Andalio (since 2015)
 Joshua Garcia (since 2015)
 Sue Ramirez (since 2015)
 Maris Racal (2015–2020; since 2021)
 Bryan Santos (since 2015)
 Michael Pangilinan (since 2015)
 Jason Fernandez (since 2015)
 Bradley Holmes (since 2015)
 Jason Dy (since 2015)
 Monique Lualhati (since 2015)
 Kyla (since 2015)
 Jairus Aquino (since 2015)
 Yassi Pressman (since 2015)
 Elmo Magalona (since 2015)
 Maxene Magalona (since 2015)
 Elha Nympha (since 2015)
 Marlo Mortel (since 2015)
 Onyok Pineda (since 2015)
 Gwen Zamora (since 2016)
 Mitch Naco (since 2016)
 Xia Vigor (since 2016)
 Karla Estrada (since 2016)
 CJ Navato (since 2016)
 Mayton Eugenio (since 2016)
 Danita Paner (since 2016)
 Rico Blanco (since 2016)
 Chun Sa Jung (since 2016)
 Jona (since 2016)
 Ritz Azul (since 2016)
 Kylie Verzosa (since 2016)
 Tony Labrusca (since 2016)
 Kyle Echarri (since 2016)
 Kira Balinger (since 2016)
 Ronnie Alonte (since 2016)
 Elisse Joson (since 2016)
 Markus Paterson (since 2016)
 Kristel Fulgar (since 2016)
 Donny Pangilinan  (2017–2020; since 2021)
 Loren Burgos (since 2017)
 Noven Belleza (since 2017)
 Julian Trono (since 2017)
 Leila Alcasid (since 2017)
 Kiana Valenciano (since 2017)
 Frankie Pangilinan (since 2017)
 BoybandPH (since 2017)
 Vivoree Esclito (since 2017)
 Awra Briguela (since 2017)
 AC Bonifacio (since 2017)
 Justin Alva (since 2017)
 Sam Shoaf (since 2017)
 Alonzo Muhlach (since 2017)
 Heaven Peralejo (since 2017)
 Jeremy Glinoga (since 2017)
 Jona Soquite (since 2017)
 Mica Becerro (since 2017)
 Aljur Abrenica (since 2017)
 Moira Dela Torre (since 2017)
 Barbie Imperial (since 2018)
 Nonong Ballinan (since 2018)
 Jayda (2018–2020; since 2021)
 Janine Berdin (since 2018)
 TNT Boys (since 2018)
 MNL48 (since 2018)
 Sheena Belarmino (since 2018)
 Krystal Brimner (since 2018)
 Charlie Dizon (since 2018)
 RK Bagatsing (since 2018)
 This Band (since 2019)
 Seth Fedelin (since 2019)
 Claudia Barretto (since 2019)
 Lara Maigue (2019–2020; since 2021)
 SB19 (2019–2020; since 2021)
 Lance Busa (since 2019)
 Fana (2019–2020; since 2021)
 Karina Bautista (since 2019)
 Aljon Mendoza (since 2019)
 I Belong to the Zoo (since 2019)
 Jane De Leon (since 2019)
 TJ Monterde (since 2019)
 Francine Diaz (since 2019)
 Gillian Vicencio (since 2019)
 Six Part Invention (since 2019)
 Jin Macapagal (since 2019)
 Elaine Duran (since 2020)
 Catriona Gray (2018–2020; since 2021)
 Lance Carr (since 2020)
 Tan Roncal (since 2020)
 Ashley del Mundo (since 2020)
 Heart Salvador (since 2020)
 Cydel Gabutero (since 2020)
 Isang Manlapaz (since 2020)
 Kendra Aguirre (since 2020)
 Jameson Blake (since 2020)
 iDolls (since 2020)
 BGYO (since 2020)
 BINI (since 2020)
 Sam Cruz (since 2021)
 KD Estrada (since 2021)
 Belle Mariano (since 2021)
 Anji Salvacion (since 2021)
 Diego Gutierrez (since 2021)
 JM Yosures (since 2021)
 Angela Ken (since 2021)
 Jeremiah Lisbo (since 2021)
 Niana Guerrero (since 2021)
 Christian Bables (since 2021)
 Mary Joy Apostol (since 2021)
 Kaori Oinuma (since 2021)
 Criza Taa (since 2021)
 Ashley Colet (since 2021)
 Kobie Brown (since 2021)
 Andi Abaya (since 2021)
 Limer Veloso (since 2021)
 Dalia Varde (since 2021)
 Gello Marquez (since 2021)
 Sophie Reyes (since 2021)
 Gigi De Lana (since 2021)
 Rachel Alejandro (since 2021)
 SAB (since 2021)
 Alyssa Muhlach (since 2021)
 Moira Lacambra (since 2021)
 Sela (since 2021)
 Zack Tabudlo (since 2021)
 Jake Ejercito (since 2021)
 Lovi Poe (since 2021)
 Kurt Mendoza (since 2021)
 Ana Ramsey (since 2021)
 Quincy Villanueva (since 2021)
 Amanda Zamora (since 2021)
 Adie (since 2021)
 Rob Deniel (since 2021)
 Reiven Umali (since 2021)
 Kei Kurosawa (since 2021)
 RJ Perkins (since 2021)
 Anthony Castillo (since 2021)
 Valentino Jaafar (since 2021)
 Anne Tenorio (since 2021)
 Drey Brown (since 2021)
 Ralph Malibunas (since 2021)
 Angelina Cruz (since 2021)
 Benedix Ramos (since 2022)
 Jordan Andrews (since 2022)
 Arabella Davao (since 2022)
 Bryan Chong (since 2022)
 Khimo Gumatay (since 2022)
 Kice (since 2022)
 Ryssi Avila (since 2022)
 Ann Raniel (since 2022)
 L.A Santos (since 2023)
 Paolo Gumabao (since 2023)

ASAP Musicians

Musical Director 

 Homer Flores - Arranger, Grand Piano and 1st Keyboard

Band Members (on hiatus since 2020) 
 Bond Samson - 2nd Keyboard
 Roy Mercado - Drums
 Bobby Taylo - Bass Guitar
 Ric Mercado - Acoustic Guitar and Electric Guitar
 Anna Inocencio - Vocalist 1
 Ida Inocencio Delos Reyes - Vocalist 2
 Rene Martinez - Vocalist 4
 Cecile Arrieta - Vocalist 3

Former Band Members 
 Ulysses Avante - Percussion

Former mainstays
 Adrian Alandy (1999–2003)
 AJ Perez† (2007–2011)
 Aldred Gatchalian (2006–2009)
 Alwyn Uytingco (1996–2006)
 Alex Gonzaga (2013–2020; returned to TV5 Network)
 Amy Perez-Castillo (1996–2003; focused on It's Showtime)
 Anna Fegi (1999–2005; began performing internationally)
 Anna Luna (2013–2015)
 Anna Larrucea (1995–2003; quit showbiz)
 Andrea del Rosario (1995–2001)
 Andi Eigenmann (2010–2016)
 Angela Velez (2000–2003)
 Angelika Dela Cruz (1995–1999; 2003–2008; returned to GMA Network)
 Angelu de Leon (1995–1996)
 Anja Aguilar
 Anjo Yllana (1996–1998)
 Arci Muñoz (2015-2020)
 Ariel Rivera (1995–2003; still currently an actor)
 Bailey May (2015-2019; now with Now United and left in 2023)
 Bangs Garcia (2007–2014)
 Baron Geisler (1995–2005; now currently an actor)
 Bea Alonzo (2002–2021; moved to GMA Network)
 Beauty Gonzalez (2008–2021; moved to GMA Network)
 Bernard Palanca (1996–2006)
 Bianca King (2016–2019; quit showbiz)
 Billy Crawford (2008–2020; moved to TV5 Network)
 Bojo Molina (1995–2000)
 Bugoy Cariño (2010–2017)
 Camille Prats (1995–2004; moved to GMA Network)
 Carlos Agassi (1996–2006; moved to GMA Network)
 Carol Banawa (1995–2003)
 Carmina Villarroel (1995–2002; returned to GMA Network)
 Charee Pineda (2006–2013; returned to GMA Network)
 Charlene Gonzales (1995–1999)
 Chris Gutierrez (2007–2011)
 Christian Bautista (2004–2013; moved to GMA Network)
 Daniel Matsunaga (2016–2019)
 Daryl Ong (2015–2020)
 Dayanara Torres (1995–1998; 1999; 2017; returned to Puerto Rico)
 Devon Seron (2010–2018; moved to GMA Network)
 Dionne Monsanto (2009–2021; quit showbiz)
 Dino Imperial (2005–2010)
 Dominic Ochoa (1997–2002)
 Duncan Ramos (2009–2011)
 Edgar Allan Guzman (2014–2017; returned to GMA Network)
 Edu Manzano (2001–2004; recently seen on Marry You Marry Me)
 Emman Abeleda (2003–2005)
 Francis Magundayao (2012–2017)
 Fretzie Bercede (2010–2012; quit showbiz)
 Gab Valenciano (2004–2011)
 Geoff Eigenmann (2004–2007; 2016–2017; now a freelance artist)
 Giselle Toengi (1996–1999)
 Gian Barbarona (2005–2009; quit showbiz)
 Gio Alvarez (1995–1997)
 Gladys Reyes (1995–2003; now moved to Net 25)
 Glaiza de Castro (2002–2006; returned to GMA Network)
 Glydel Mercado (1995–2002)
 Hashtags (2016-2020)
 Hazel Ann Mendoza (2003–2009; quit showbiz)
 Heart Evangelista-Escudero (2001–2007; moved to GMA Network)
 Hero Angeles (2004–2005; 2015; now a freelance artist)
 Irish Fullerton (2006–2009; quit showbiz)
 Iya Villania-Arellano (2004–2014; returned to GMA Network)
 Ivan Dorschner (2010–2012; quit showbiz)
 Jabbawockeez (2010–2011; returned to the United States)
 Jan Marini (1995–2003; quit showbiz)
 Janus del Prado (2000–2017)
 Jao Mapa (1995–1999)
 Jason Abalos (2005–2017; moved to GMA Network)
 Jaya (1998–2000; 2016–2021; migrated to U.S.)
 Jay Manalo (1995–2002)
 Jay R (2015–2020; 2021)
 Jay-R Siaboc (2007–2014)
 Jerome Sala (2005–2007)
 Jovit Baldivino† (2010–2022)
 Jessa Zaragoza (2000–2019)
 Jewel Mische (2010–2013; quit showbiz)
 Jhong Hilario (2003–2016; focused on It's Showtime)
 John Lloyd Cruz (1997–2017; 2019–2021; moved to GMA Network)
 John Wayne Sace (2003–2005; recently seen on FPJs Ang Probinsyano)
 John Estrada (1995–2004; moved to GMA Network on 2018 and returned to ABS-CBN in 2021)
 Jessy Mendiola (2008–2019)
 John Prats (1995–2016; focused on FPJ's Ang Probinsyano and It's Showtime)
 Jon Avila (2007–2010; quit showbiz)
 Julia Clarete (1997–2003; quit showbiz)
 Karylle (2008–2015; focused on It's Showtime)
 Khalil Ramos (2012–2020; moved to GMA Network)
 King Girado (2004–2006)
 Kisses Delavin (2017–2019; moved to GMA Network)
 Kris Aquino (1995–2004)
 Kris Lawrence (2006–2010; 2015–2018; still currently performing)
 Kristofer Martin (2007–2009; moved to GMA Network)
 Kuh Ledesma (1997–1999; 2003–2007; now a freelance artist)
 Lala Vinzon (2017–2021; moved to GMA Network)
 Lani Misalucha (1998–2000; 2007–2009; 2012–2016; moved to GMA Network)
 Lauren Young (2008–2012; moved to GMA Network)
 Lindsay Custodio (1995–2001)
 Maja Salvador (2003–2020; now a freelance artist)
 Makisig Morales (2006–2019; migrated to Australia)
 Maricel Soriano (1995–2003; now a freelance artist)
 Mark Bautista (2004–2010; moved to GMA Network)
 Martin del Rosario (2007–2013; moved to GMA Network)
 Matt Evans (2006–2015)
 Mark Anthony Fernandez (1995–2001; returned to GMA Network)
 Matthew Mendoza (1995–2001)
 Maxine Medina (2016–2020; moved to GMA Network)
 Mavy & Cassy Legaspi (2014–2016; moved to GMA Network)
 Meg Imperial (2013–2017)
 Megan Young (2009–2013; returned to GMA Network)
 Melissa Ricks (2004–2013)
 Mhyco Aquino (2003–2008)
 Michelle Bayle (1999–2004; now quit showbiz)
 Mico Aytona (2003–2005)
 Migz Haleco (2017-2018)
 Mika Dela Cruz (2013–2016; moved to GMA Network)
 Miles Ocampo (2015-2019; now under Crown Artist Management)
 Mylene Dizon (1995–2003; returned to GMA 7; returned again to ABS-CBN)
 Myrtle Sarrosa (2012–2020; moved to GMA Network)
 Nikki Gil (2005–2015; quit showbiz)
 Nikka Valencia (1995–2000)
 Nikki Bacolod (2005–2009; now a freelance artist)
 Nicole Uysiuseng (2008–2016; quit showbiz)
 Paolo Contis (1996–2004; moved to GMA Network)
 Paul Salas (2009–2018; returned to GMA Network)
 Paula Peralejo (1995–2004; quit showbiz)
 Pokwang (2007–2020; moved to GMA Network)
 Pops Fernandez (1995–2003; returned to GMA Network)
 Princess Velasco (2010–2016; now a freelance artist)
 Rachelle Ann Go (2004–2010; returned to GMA Network)
 Rafael Rosell (2002–2012)
 Rayver Cruz (2005–2018; returned to GMA Network)
 Regine Tolentino (1995–2003; 2017)
 Rica Peralejo (1995–2007; quit showbiz)
 Richard Gomez (1998–2003; 2011–2016)
 Richard Yap (2012–2020; moved to GMA Network)
 Rico Yan† (1995–2002)
 Rhys Miguel (2021)
 RJ Rosales† (2001–2004)
 Ryan Agoncillo (2001–2006; returned to GMA Network)
 Sandara Park (2004–2007; returned to South Korea)
 Sarah Lahbati (2015–2017; now currently married)
 Sergio Garcia (2003–2005)
 Sunshine Dizon (2021-2023; returned to GMA Network)
 Tom Rodriguez (2010–2012; moved to GMA Network)
 Toni Gonzaga (2005-2022)  
 Tootsie Guevara (1997–2003)
 Vanessa del Bianco (1996–2005)
 Venus Raj (2011–2013)
 Victor Neri (1995–2006)
 Victor Basa (2006–2011)
 Wendy Valdez (2006–2010; quit showbiz)
 Wowie de Guzman (1995–2001)
 Xian Lim (2008–2021; moved to GMA Network)
 Ylona Garcia (2015–2020; now returned to Australia)
 Zephanie (2019–2021; moved to GMA Network)

Release
For most of its broadcast history ASAP was broadcast through ABS-CBN from its premiere in 1995 to 2020. Following the shutdown of ABS-CBN due to its franchise non-renewal in mid-2020, ASAP moved to ABS-CBN Corporation's pay television network Kapamilya Channel with simulcasts of the variety show available in Jeepney TV. In October 2020, the show made its free TV return on A2Z. On January 24, 2021, ASAP started its simulcasts on TV5, replacing the Brightlight Productions shows such as Sunday Noontime Live! and Sunday Kada.

Ratings
ASAP was consistently the leading Sunday noontime show on Philippine television from 1995 until it went down to no. 2 in 2002, when SOP took over. It ranked number one again throughout 2003 and 2004, but went back to number 2 when GMA became the leading network in Mega Manila. ASAP once again became the ratings leader from 2007 until early 2020; and the ratings leadership became more intense in 2009 which caused the reformatting of SOP in November of that year.

Segments

Current
 ASAP P-POP – features P-Pop boy and girl groups for their hot debut stage, new releases, comeback performances and special performances on stage.
 ASAP New Gen Divas (also known as ASAP New Gen Birit Divas / New Gen Birit Duets / New Gen Birit Idols / New Gen Birit Sing-Offs) – features young singers who come from mid to late 2010s singing competitions.
 ASAP Clash Dance - the reboot of this hit 2000s dance segment which 2 artists will clash dance performances on the dance floor.
 ASAP Rockoustic Heartthrobs - an acoustic collaboration segment between Kapamilya heartthrobs.
 ASAP Star Magic Presents – a reboot of the Full Circle segment, this is where Star Magic artists sing and dance on stage.
 ASAP Fresh – performances from Filipino bands and their collaboration with the ASAP performers.
 ASAP Discoveries – features netizens who went viral and they get the chance to perform with ASAP mainstay.
 ASAP Exclusive – features performances from the special guests or international artists.
 Regine Velasquez Collaborations – Features duets/collaborations between the Asia's Songbird Regine Velasquez and other ASAP artists.
 Sarah G. Specials - Features performances from the Asia's Popstar Royalty Sarah Geronimo.
 The Greatest Showdown – the mainstays perform/sing Filipino and English songs depending on a certain theme. A merger of the 'Champions Showdown' and the 'Music Box' segments, this segment was introduced on December 2, 2018.

Former
 ASAP Concert Presents – Showcases concert performances from the ASAP artists.
 ASAP Transformation – a segment inspired by 'Your Face Sounds Familiar'.

Licensing and merchandise

ASAP Music

ASAP Music is the record label of ASAP, distributed by Star Music. The label has released a tribute compilation album to OPM classic pop-rock band, Hotdog. It has also released soundtracks of ABS-CBN TV series Sana Maulit Muli, My Girl and Your Song presents: My Only Hope—all of which starred Kim Chiu and Gerald Anderson. It has also released dance compilations for the defunct segment "Ultimate Dance 4" and the current segment "Supah Dance Plus". All of which contain original remixes and dance songs.

ASAP Pop Viewers' Choice Awards

ASAP Pop Viewers' Choice Awards is an annual award show which is held on a Sunday afternoon during ASAP variety show every end of the year, usually November or December. It honors the year's biggest television, movie, and music acts, as voted by Kapamilya fans. In November 2015, the ASAP Pop Viewers' Choice Awards is changed to ASAP Pop Teen Choice Awards.

ASAP Fanatic
ASAP Fanatic is the first variety show for teens aired every Sunday afternoon after ASAP Mania on ABS-CBN in the Philippines. It showcases select teen celebrities of the network, which features production numbers like Full Circle including the winners of Star Circle Quest, TV Idol, Qpids, Pinoy Big Brother evicted housemates and ABS-CBN Star Magic talents as well. It ran from May 23, 2004, to June 25, 2006, and was replaced by Love Spell on its timeslot.

Others
 ASAP Lifestyle - ASAP's clothing line, available through BUM boutiques in the Philippines.
 ASAP Bookazine - ASAP's book-magazine, and the first ever book-magazine released by a Philippine TV show.
 ASAP Online - ASAP's official website, where viewers, fans and supporters can view information about the show, read fun facts about the cast, get an update on the events and lifestyle, view photos and videos on-set, send their requests to artists, and even chat with them.
ASAP Remix - A "throwback" spin-off musical variety show aired on cable channel Jeepney TV every Sunday from 12:20 AM to 2:00 AM, just hours before the latest ASAP episode that will air on ABS-CBN. It features selected memorable production numbers featuring the entire ASAP cast with special guests for the past 20 years.
ASAP Natin 'To Replay - A replay of the show's episode is aired on Metro Channel every Sunday from 9:00 PM to 11:00 PM.

Studios used by ASAP

Delta Theatre (February 5, 1995–early 1997)
ABS-CBN Studio 10 (March 1997–present)

Other tours
Since 1996, ASAP has held at least one international show every year (except years when the COVID-19 pandemic prevailed). The international shows are held in the middle/late part of the year, and a taped episode is aired on the week of the concert, then the international concert is aired in the following two weeks, divided into two parts.

Awards

See also
 List of programs broadcast by ABS-CBN
 List of programs broadcast by Kapamilya Channel
 List of programs broadcast by Kapamilya Online Live
 List of programs broadcast by Metro Channel
 List of programs broadcast by Jeepney TV
 List of programs broadcast by A2Z (Philippine TV channel)
 List of programs broadcast by TV5 (Philippine TV network)
 ABS-CBN
 Kapamilya Channel
 Kapamilya Online Live
 A2Z
 Jeepney TV
 Metro Channel
 TV5
 Star Magic

References

Notes

External links
 Official Website
 

 
1995 Philippine television series debuts
1990s Philippine television series
2000s Philippine television series
2010s Philippine television series
2020s Philippine television series
ABS-CBN original programming
Philippine variety television shows
Philippine music television series
Filipino-language television shows
English-language television shows
Television productions suspended due to the COVID-19 pandemic